Que Sera is a 2014 Sri Lankan Sinhala dark comedy romance film directed by Parakrama Jayasinghe and co-produced by Mayali Jayasinghe and Rishini Jayasinghe for ELF Movies. It stars Dilhani Ekanayake and W. Jayasiri in lead roles along with Priyankara Perera and Cyril Wickramage. Music co-composed by Somapala Rathnayake, Lelum Ratnayake and Mahesh Denipitiya. The film runs with both English and Sinhala dialogues. It is the 1212th Sri Lankan film in the Sinhala cinema.

Yoshini Abeysekera made her debut acting in cinema with this film with the support of English theatre veteran Hans Billimoria. The film has won many awards at the film award ceremonies.

Plot

Cast
 Dilhani Ekanayake as Tara
 W. Jayasiri as Ananda
 Michelle Herft as Sera
 Yoshini Abeysekera as Samantha
 Hans Bilimoria as Billy
 Priyankara Perera as Lakmal
 Sando Harris as James
 Amarasiri Kalansuriya
 Anura Bandara Rajaguru as Exorcist
 Cyril Wickramage
 Oshini Perera 
 Chami Senanayake
 Bandula Suriyabandara
 Rahal Bulathsinhala
 K. A. Piyakaru as Nadan
 Anjela Seneviratne
 Manel Wanaguru
 Nita Fernando
 Damith Fonseka
 Srimal Wedisinghe 
 Sandun Wijesiri

Awards
 Best Actress at Derana Film Awards 2015 - Michelle Herft
 Best Director at Derana Film Awards 2015 - Parakrama Jayasingha
 Best Supporting Actor at Derana Film Awards 2015 - Hans Billimoria

References

External links
සමනල තටුවන් ජීවිතය ගැන කියන කේ සෙරා

2014 films
2010s Sinhala-language films